Kensal refers to:
Kensal Green, also known as Kensal Rise, part of London, United Kingdom
Kensal Town, part of London, United Kingdom
Kensal, North Dakota, United States